Norman Township may refer to:
 Norman Township, Grundy County, Illinois
 Norman Township, Michigan
 Norman Township, Pine County, Minnesota
 Norman Township, Yellow Medicine County, Minnesota
 Norman Township, Dent County, Missouri
 Norman Township, Traill County, North Dakota, in Traill County, North Dakota

Township name disambiguation pages